The Men's featherweight is a competition featured at the 2013 World Taekwondo Championships, and was held at the Exhibition Center of Puebla in Puebla, Mexico on July 17. Featherweights were limited to a maximum of 68 kilograms in body mass.

Medalists

Results
DQ — Won by disqualification
P — Won by punitive declaration
R — Won by referee stop contest
W — Won by withdrawal

Finals

Top half

Section 1

Section 2

Section 3

Section 4

Bottom half

Section 5

Section 6

Section 7

Section 8

References
Entry List
Draw
Results
Results Book Pages 299–379

Men's 68